Lissington is a village and civil parish in the West Lindsey district of Lincolnshire, England. The population of the civil parish at the 2011 census was 154.

The church, dedicated to Saint John the Baptist, is a Grade II listed building built from ironstone and greenstone. It dates from 1796, with a restoration in 1895 and further additions in 1925.

Lissington Church of England School was built in 1854 as a National school and closed 21 December 1950.

References

External links

West Lindsey District
Villages in Lincolnshire
Civil parishes in Lincolnshire